Louder Than Words is the fourth studio album by American singer Lionel Richie. It was released by Mercury Records on April 16, 1996, in the United States. The album marked Richie's debut with the record label as well as his first album of new material in 10 years after a longer hiatus during which he went through a much-publicized divorce from his first wife Brenda Harvey and the loss of his father and a close friend. Apart from chief producer James Anthony Carmichael, the singer worked with Jimmy Jam and Terry Lewis, Babyface and David Foster on Louder Than Words.

Upon release, the album earned generally mixed to positive review from music critics, many of whom praised Richie's vocal performances and the ballads on the album but found the overall material old-fashioned. Commercially, Louder Than Words failed to reprise the success of Richies's previous multi-platinum studio albums Can't Slow Down (1983) and Dancing on the Ceiling (1986), though it entered the top thirty on the majority of the album charts it appeared on, going gold in France and the US and silver in the United Kingdom.

Background
Following years of intense touring and recording, Richie was suffering from burnout symptoms by March 1986. While he only intended to take a year off, his father, Lionel Richie Sr., fell ill before dying in 1990. After his death, Richie struggled with what he described as "a massive depression". At the same time, he was divorcing from his first wife Brenda Harvey after nearly two decades of marriage. Right after that, amid the release of his first compilation album Back to Front (1992) and the pre-production of a new studio album, his best friend informed Richie that he was dying from AIDS-related causes. It was not until his passing, that Richie felt ready to produce new music. Welcoming his second child, son Miles, with his second wife Diane Alexander in May 1994 eventually helped jumpstarting a return to recording. In a 2018 interview with People magazine, Richie commented: "They didn’t know what the hell I did for a living so I thought at that particular point, let’s go back and prove to the kids what I do. And so that was the incentive. I realized, this is what I should be doing."

Critical reception

AllMusic editor Stephen Thomas Erlewine found that "although there are some slight attempts to incorporate new jack and hip-hop influences into Richie's sound, Louder Than Words relies on his trademark balladeering, which remains his forte. All of the weak moments on Louder Than Words are ill-advised forays into rap – to put it bluntly, he can rap about as well as Snoop Dogg can sing. Although the ballads aren't as strong as his late-'70s and early-'80s standards, they are nevertheless pleasant, which makes the record a worthwhile purchase for fans." Chicago Tribune critic Calvin Wilson declared the album "a mixed bag. Some of the selections are little more than filler – but when Richie is fully engaged, he comes up with music that's truly exhilarating. To be sure, Richie understands what's expected of him."

Cheo Hodari Coker, writing for the Los Angeles Times, called the album a "welcome return" and wrote: "From beginning to end, Louder Than Words is palatable enough for the crossover crowd, but also soulful enough for his now-older black female fans, many of whom moved on to Babyface in Richie’s absence. The elegant “Don’t Wanna Lose You,” the uncharacteristically sensual "Say I Do" and the easygoing jam "Ordinary Girl" show that Richie hasn’t lost any of his charm or compositional powers." Entertainment Weekly critic J.D. Considine remarked that "Richie’s middle-of-the-road R&B may as well be from another century. It isn’t that he can’t work a groove; what makes Richie seem so old-fashioned is that he doesn’t understand that these days the groove is everything. A pity, because even if he hasn’t kept up with the times, he has grown [...] Even if Louder Than Words doesn’t put him back on top of the charts, it’s proof that Richie is on top of his game."

Chart performance
In the United States, Louder Than Words debuted at number 33 on the US Billboard 200 with first weeks sales of 28,000 copies. It peaked at number 28.

Track listing

Notes
 signifies a co-producer

Personnel 
Credits lifted from the album's liner notes.

Performers and musicians

 Lionel Richie – lead vocals, backing vocals (1, 4, 5, 7, 9, 10), keyboards (2, 11), rhythm arrangements (5), tenor sax solo (11), acoustic piano (12)
 Michael Boddicker – synthesizers (1, 2, 4, 5, 6, 9, 11, 12)
 Lloyd Tolbert – keyboards (1, 4, 9, 11), synth bass (1), drum programming (1, 2, 4, 9, 11), rhythm arrangements (9)
 Greg Phillinganes – keyboards (1, 11, 12), acoustic piano (5), synth bass (9)
 John Barnes – synthesizers (2, 6, 11)
 James Anthony Carmichael – keyboards (2, 4), string arrangements and conductor (2, 4, 6, 7, 11), rhythm arrangements (5), horn arrangements and conductor (11)
 Simon Franglen – synthesizers (2, 7, 11)
 James "Big Jim" Wright – keyboards (3, 8, 10)
 Jimmy Jam – all other instruments (3, 8, 10)
 Terry Lewis – all other instruments (3, 8, 10)
 David Cochran – synthesizers (5), guitars (5), drum programming (5), saxophone (5), horn and rhythm arrangements (5)
 Steve Porcaro – synthesizers (6, 13), programming (13), rhythm arrangements (13)
 Tony Smith – programming (6, 12)
 Babyface – keyboards (7), drum programming (7), backing vocals (7)
 Claude Gaudette – synthesizers (13)
 William Ross – synthesizers (13)
 David Paich – keyboards (13), rhythm arrangements (13)
 Michael Thompson – guitars (1, 2, 4, 5, 6, 9, 11, 12)
 Timothy May – guitars (2)
 Dean Parks – guitars (2, 12)
 Mike Scott – guitars (3, 8, 10)
 Robert Palmer – guitars (5)
 Steve Lukather – guitars (13)
 Sekou Bunch – bass guitar (4, 6)
 Nathan East – bass guitar (6, 7, 12)
 Randy Jackson – bass guitar (11, 12)
 Alex Richbourg – drum programming (3)
 Ricky Lawson – drums (6)
 John Robinson – drums (7)
 Jeff Taylor – drum programming (8)
 Chris Dave – drums (10)
 Omar Hakim – drums (11, 12)
 Jeff Porcaro – drums (13)
 Paulinho da Costa – percussion (2, 4, 7, 11)
 Michael Fisher – percussion (13)
 Tommy Morgan – harmonica (2)
 Toots Thielemans – harmonica (6)
 Brandon Fields – saxophones (6, 12)
 Dan Higgins – saxophones (6, 12)
 Kim Hutchcroft – saxophones (12)
 George Bohanon – trombone (6), French horn (12)
 Andrew Martin – trombone (6)
 Bill Reichenbach, Jr. – trombone (12)
 Jerry Hey – trumpet (1)
 Darrel Anthony Browning – trumpet (5)
 Daniel Fornero – trumpet (6)
 Oscar Brashear – trumpet (6, 12)
 Gary Grant – trumpet (6, 12)
 Charles Davis – trumpet (12)
 Warren Luening – trumpet (12)
 Don Waldrup – tuba (6)
 John Dickson – French horn (6)
 Marylin Johnson – French horn (6)
 Brad Warnaar – French horn (6, 12)
 David Duke – French horn (12)
 Brian O'Connor – French horn (12)
 Jeremy Lubbock – string arrangements and conductor (6, 12)
 Marva King – backing vocals (1, 4, 5, 7, 9, 11), BGV arrangements (1, 9)
 4.0 – backing vocals (3, 8)
 Phillip Ingram – backing vocals (4, 5)
 Arnold McCuller – backing vocals (4, 7, 9)
 Peter Gabriel – backing vocals (7)
 Ayub Ogada – backing vocals (7)
 Sue Ann Carwell – backing vocals (11)

Technical

 Calvin Harris – engineer and mixing (1, 2, 4-7, 9, 11)
 Milton Chen – engineer (1, 2, 5, 9, 12), assistant engineer
 Barney Perkins – engineer (2, 6, 11, 12)
 Steve Hodge – engineer and mixing (3, 8, 10)
 Jeff Taylor – engineer (3, 8, 10), assistant engineer 
 Fred Law – engineer (4, 9)
 Humberto Gatica – engineer (6, 13), mixing (13)
 John Jessel – engineer (6)
 Brad Gilderman – engineer (7)
 David Reitzas – engineer (13)
 Drake Ayen – assistant engineer 
 David Betencourt – assistant engineer 
 Craig Brock – assistant engineer 
 Darrel Anthony Browning – assistant engineer 
 Jim Champange – assistant engineer 
 Michael W. Douglass – assistant engineer 
 Gasten Kamal Graham – assistant engineer 
 Patrick Karamian – assistant engineer 
 Bill Kinsley – assistant engineer 
 Bill Leonard – assistant engineer 
 Doug Michael – assistant engineer
 Jennifer Monnar – assistant engineer
 Pierre Monroe – assistant engineer 
 Jim Nelson – assistant engineer 
 John Nelson – assistant engineer 
 Kenny Ochoa – assistant engineer
 Sean O'Dwyer – assistant engineer 
 Greg Pinto – assistant engineer 
 Alex Reed – assistant engineer 
 Mike Retter – assistant engineer 
 Rail Rogut – assistant engineer 
 Bill Smith – assistant engineer 
 John Srebalus – assistant engineer 
 Ken Villeneuve – assistant engineer 
 Guy Costa – mastering 
 Ivy Skoff – production coordinator 
 John Coulter – art direction, design 
 Alan Silfen – art direction, design, photography 
 Erin Flanagan – styling
 Freddy Demann – management

Charts

Weekly charts

Year-end charts

Certifications

Release history

References

1996 albums
Lionel Richie albums
Mercury Records albums
Albums produced by Jimmy Jam and Terry Lewis